Bucculatrix acuta is a moth in the family Bucculatricidae. It was first described by Svetlana Vladimirovna Baryshnikova in 2001, and is found in Nepal.

References

Natural History Museum Lepidoptera generic names catalog

Bucculatricidae
Moths described in 2001
Moths of Asia